Darus Salam Thana is a thana, an administrative unit, of Dhaka District, Bangladesh.

History
During the Bangladesh Liberation war, Bengali intellectuals were killed by Pakistan Army in this area. After the Independence of Bangladesh a memorial was constructed for the intellectuals. The thana itself was created in on 23 August 2008 from areas under Mirpur Thana.

The thana is under the jurisdiction of Darussalam Police Station of the Bangladesh Police. They are responsible for law enforcement in the thana. The police station was established on 23 September 2008.

Notable educational institutions
There are 4 notable educational institutions in the thana according to Banglapedia.
 Govt. Bangla College
 Bangladesh-Japan Training Institute
 F.M. International School and College
 Kallyanpur Girls' School and College

References

Thanas of Dhaka
Central business districts in Bangladesh